He Said, She Said or He Said She Said may refer to:

Film and TV
He Said, She Said (film), 1991 romantic comedy film starring Kevin Bacon and Elizabeth Perkins.
He Said, She Said (game show), an American game show hosted by Joe Garagiola
He Said, She Said (TV series), a Canadian cooking show
"She Said, He Said", prequel to "The Name of the Doctor", an episode of the television series Doctor Who
"He Said, She Said", an episode of the animated television series I Am Weasel
 "He Said, She Said" (Brooklyn Nine-Nine), an episode of the sixth season of Brooklyn Nine-Nine

Music
 He Said She Said, a 2010 album by Sue Foley and Peter Karp
 "He Said She Said" (Ashley Tisdale song), 2006
 "He Said She Said" (Chvrches song), 2021

See also
"She Said She Said", a 1966 song by The Beatles